The H.V. McKay Memorial Gardens, originally the Sunshine Gardens, are a public space located in the Melbourne suburb of Sunshine, Victoria, Australia. Established in 1909, the Gardens are Australia's oldest remaining industrial garden and one of only two remaining in Australia, the heritage-listed gardens on Anderson Road were established by H.V. McKay as Sunshine Gardens later taken over by Brimbank City Council and renamed the H.V. McKay Memorial Gardens. The development of the gardens was not only an expression of H.V. McKay's own social philosophy but also represented a changing attitude to Urban Planning that is known as the "Garden Suburb" movement. A Friends Group was established in 2007 to rescue the Gardens from serious decline and in April 2012, local residents were campaigning to preserve the original state of the public space.

History
In 1909 the Sunshine Gardens were developed to provide an amenity for the employees of the Sunshine Harvester Works. Designed by the assistant city engineer at Ballarat, F. A. Horsfallm and laid out by head gardener S. G. Thompson, the eight-acre Gardens were sited alongside the factory and incorporated recreation facilities and popular horticultural displays.

According to Bill Bampton, the Gardens included tennis courts and pavilion, a bandstand, a bowling green, a substantial house for the head gardener, a conservatory and associated works areas. Under inaugural curator Thompson (1909–27), and curators James Willan (1930–39) and Harold Gray (1939-50), the Gardens developed a reputation for its chrysanthemums and dahlias, attracting workers and their families, as well as other local residents.

Transfer to City of Sunshine and eventually the National Trust of Australia
In 1953, the management of Sunshine Gardens was handed to the newly established City of Sunshine. At this time, it was renamed the H.V. McKay Memorial Gardens. In the 1990s, the garden was listed by the National Trust of Australia and in the Register of the National Estate. In 2007 the Friends of McKay Gardens was formed to help maintain the gardens.

Threatened destruction for rail construction
Regional Rail Link proposals entailed the destruction of the gardens as part of a grade separation along Anderson Road in Sunshine, despite the fact that this impact appeared nowhere in its planning documents. The proposal entailed the removal of more than 130 square metres of land, destruction of path systems, and the relocation of the last remaining heritage fabric. After having condemned the RRL while in opposition, the new Liberal Minister for Public Transport, Terry Mulder, responded to the community controversy by saying: "you can’t keep everyone happy". After considerable community resistance and strong lobbying by Brimbank City Council, the RRL Authority reduced its acquisition of land to approximately five square metres.

References

External links
 Friends of McKay Gardens website

Parks in Melbourne
Sunshine, Victoria
City of Brimbank
1909 establishments in Australia